Bezirk Liezen is a district of the state of Styria in Austria. It is by far the largest district in Austria, about 1.2 times the size of the next district, and is divided into two "subdistricts": Bereich Liezen, and Expositur Gröbming. On December 31, 2011 the former third subdistrict Expositur Bad Aussee was abolished.

Municipalities
Since the 2015 Styria municipal structural reform, it has consisted of the following municipalities:

Bereich Liezen:

 Admont
 Aigen im Ennstal
 Altaussee
 Altenmarkt bei Sankt Gallen
 Ardning
 Bad Aussee
 Bad Mitterndorf
 Gaishorn am See
 Grundlsee
 Irdning-Donnersbachtal
 Landl
 Lassing
 Liezen
 Rottenmann
 Sankt Gallen
 Selzthal
 Stainach-Pürgg
 Trieben
 Wildalpen
 Wörschach

Expositur Gröbming:

 Aich
 Gröbming
 Haus im Ennstal
 Michaelerberg-Pruggern
 Mitterberg-Sankt Martin
 Öblarn
 Ramsau am Dachstein
 Schladming
 Sölk

Municipalities before 2015
Towns (Gemeinden) are indicated in boldface; suburbs, hamlets and other subdivisions of a municipality are indicated in small characters.

Bereich Liezen
 Admont
Aigen, Krumau bei Admont
 Aigen im Ennstal
Aich, Aiglern, Fischern, Gatschen, Hohenberg, Ketten, Lantschern, Mitteregg, Quilk, Ritzmannsdorf, Sallaberg, Schlattham, Tachenberg, Vorberg
 Altenmarkt bei Sankt Gallen
Essling
 Ardning
Frauenberg, Pürgschachen
 Donnersbach
Erlsberg, Fuchsberg, Furrach, Ilgenberg, Ritzenberg, Winklern, Planneralm
 Donnersbachwald
 Gaishorn am See
Au bei Gaishorn am See
 Gams bei Hieflau
 Hall bei Admont
 Irdning
Altirdning, Bleiberg, Falkenburg, Kienach, Raumberg
 Johnsbach
 Landl
Großreifling, Kirchenlandl, Krippau, Lainbach, Mooslandl
 Lassing
Gatschling, Neusiedl, Sonnberg, Fuchslucken, Heuberg, Schattenberg, Spiegelsberg, Stein, Treschmitz, Trojach, Unterberg, Wieden bei Lassing, Altlassing, Burgfried, Döllach, Lassing-Kirchdorf, Moos, Niedermoos
 Liezen
Pyhrn, Reithtal
 Oppenberg
 Palfau
 Pürgg-Trautenfels
Pürgg, Trautenfels, Unterburg, Untergrimming, Zlem
 Rottenmann
Bärndorf, Edlach, Singsdorf, Boder, Bruckmühl, Büschendorf, Klamm, Sankt Georgen, Strechau, Strechen, Villmannsdorf
 Sankt Gallen
Bergerviertel, Oberreith, Reiflingviertel
 Selzthal
Neulassing, Versbichl
 Stainach
Niederhofen
 Tauplitz
Furt, Klachau, Tauplitzalm
 Treglwang
Furth
 Trieben
Dietmannsdorf bei Trieben, Sankt Lorenzen im Paltental, Schwarzenbach
 Weißenbach an der Enns
Bichl, Breitau, Oberlaussa, Unterlaussa, Wolfsbachau
 Weißenbach bei Liezen
 Weng im Gesäuse
Gstatterboden
 Wildalpen
 Wörschach
Maitschern
 Altaussee
Fischerndorf, Lichtersberg, Lupitsch, Puchen
 Bad Aussee
Anger, Eselsbach, Gallhof, Gschlößl, Lerchenreith, Obertressen, Reitern, Reith, Sarstein, Unterkainisch
 Bad Mitterndorf
Krungl, Neuhofen, Obersdorf, Rödschitz, Sonnenalm, Thörl, Zauchen
 Grundlsee
Archkogl, Bräuhof, Gößl, Mosern, Untertressen
 Pichl-Kainisch
Kainisch, Pichl, Knoppen, Mühlreith

Expositur Gröbming
 Aich
Aich, Assach
 Gössenberg
Auberg, Petersberg
 Gröbming
 Großsölk
 Haus im Ennstal
Birnberg, Ennsling, Gumpenberg, Lehen, Oberhaus, Oberhausberg, Weißenbach
 Kleinsölk
 Michaelerberg
Pruggern
 Mitterberg
Gersdorf, Salza, Strimitzen, Tipschern, Unterlengdorf
 Niederöblarn
Gritschenberg, Sonnberg, Straßerberg
 Öblarn
Sonnberg
 Pichl-Preunegg
Gleiming, Pichl, Preunegg
 Pruggern
 Ramsau am Dachstein
Ramsau, Ramsauleiten, Schildlehen
 Rohrmoos-Untertal
Fastenberg, Obertal, Rohrmoos, Unterthal
 Sankt Martin am Grimming
Diemlern, Oberlengdorf, Salza, Tipschern, Unterlengdorf
 Sankt Nikolai im Sölktal
 Schladming
Klaus

References

 
Districts of Styria